South Wootton is a village and civil parish in the English county of Norfolk, approximately  north-east of King's Lynn.
For the purposes of local government, it falls within the District of King's Lynn and West Norfolk.

The older part of the village grew up around the village green and St. Mary's church, though there has been a fair amount of new housing built since the 1960s.
There are two schools in South Wootton, South Wootton Infant School, followed by South Wootton Junior School.

The Church of the Virgin Mary in South Wootton is an Anglican church, led by the Rector, the Rev. Canon James Nash.

References

External links

 The Church website contains information about the area and the work of the community. 

Villages in Norfolk
King's Lynn and West Norfolk
Civil parishes in Norfolk